Paramvah Studios is an Indian film studio involved in movie distribution and production. It is located in Nagadevanahalli, Bengaluru.

Establishment 
Rakshit Shetty, well-known actor, director and lyrics-writer in the Kannada film industry started Paramvah in 2015 as a platform for upcoming artists after his movies ‘Simple Agi Ondh Love Story’, ‘Ulidavaru Kandanthe’ and ‘Kirik Party’ won several movie awards. The company was inaugurated by Puneeth Rajkumar in Nagadevanahalli, Bengaluru.

Films produced

Awards 
‘Kirik Party’ won several awards after its release in 2017.

IIFA Utsavam (March 2017)- Best Film, Best leading Role, Best Music Direction, Best Lyrics, Best Male Playback Singer.

Karnataka State Film Awards (April 2017) – Popular Entertaining Film

Filmfare Awards South (June 2017) – Best Director, Best Actor, Best Supporting Actress, Best Music Director, Best Male Playback Singer

South Indian International Movie Awards (July 2017) – Best Film, Best Director, Best Supporting Actor, Best Debut Actress, Best Music Director, Best Lyricist, Entertainer of the Year.

References

External links 
 Paramvah Studios

Film production companies based in Bangalore
2015 establishments in Karnataka
Indian companies established in 2015
Mass media companies established in 2015